Whitcliff Nathaniel Atkinson (born 17 September 1972) is a Bahamian cricketer. Atkinson is a right-handed batsman who bowls left-arm medium pace and played primarily as a wicketkeeper. Atkinson represented the Bahamas national cricket team.

Atkinson made his debut for the Bahamas in the 2002 ICC Americas Championship against the United States.	

Atkinson made his Twenty20 debut for the Bahamas against the Cayman Islands in the 1st round of the 2006 Stanford 20/20.  He played his second and final Twenty20 match for the Bahamas in the 1st round of the 2008 Stanford 20/20 against Jamaica; in both matches he was dismissed for ducks.

Atkinson represented the Bahamas in the 2008 ICC World Cricket League Division Five and represented the Bahamas in the 2010 ICC Americas Championship Division 1.

In July 2019, he was named in the Bahamian squad for their tour of Bermuda.

References

External links
Whitcliff Atkinson at Cricinfo
Whitcliff Atkinson at CricketArchive

1972 births
Living people
Bahamian cricketers
Wicket-keepers